Loom, Inc., is a technology company that provides video communication software for work. Loom’s technology includes screen and camera recording, video editing, transcription, and the ability to share the recorded video link with others.

According to Forbes, the company is valued at $1.5 billion and has secured $200 million in funding from venture funds such as Sequoia, Andreessen Horowitz, ICONIQ, Coatue, and Kleiner Perkins.

The company is remote, but is headquartered in San Francisco, CA, with an office in New York.

History 
In 2015, the company was founded by Vinay Hiremath, Shahed Khan, and Joe Thomas in San Francisco, CA.

In June 2016, the Loom Chrome extension was released for recording a user’s screen and face, and then providing a link for the video.

In August, 2018, Loom desktop app was launched, followed by the app for iOS in 2020 and Android in 2021.

In June 2021, Loom launched a software developer kit beta version that allows companies to add a Loom-powered video record button to their own applications.

In the same year, the company surpassed 14 million users and 200,000 businesses across 230 countries worldwide.

In 2022, Loom launched Loom HQ as the next iteration of the company’s platform for corporate teams.

Investments 
In October 2016, the company closed its Seed Round with $600,000. The lead investor was 1517 Fund.

In February 2019, Loom received nearly $11m in a Series A round led by Kleiner Perkins.

In November 2019, the video messaging platform raised $30m in a Series B round led by venture capital firm Sequoia Capital.

In May 2020, Loom closed a $28.75m second Series B by Sequoia Capital and Coatue. The investments valued the company at an estimated $350 million.

In May 2021, the company received $130m in a Series C round led by Andreessen Horowitz, securing the company’s status as a “unicorn” and a $1.53 billion valuation.

Recognition 
In 2021, Loom entered the top three favorites in the category "Communicate and collaborate" Google's Best Chrome Extensions.

In the same year, the company was named the best medium-size companies for remote employees by Quartz.

In 2022, Loom was included on Inc.’s “Best Workplaces 2022” list.

References 

Software companies based in the San Francisco Bay Area
Software companies of the United States
Software companies established in 2015